ThyssenKrupp AG (stylized as thyssenkrupp) is a German industrial engineering and steel production multinational conglomerate. It is the result of the 1999 merger of Thyssen AG and Krupp and has its operational headquarters in Duisburg and Essen. The company claims to be one of the world's largest steel producers, and it was ranked tenth-largest worldwide by revenue in 2015.  It is divided into 670 subsidiaries worldwide. The largest shareholders are Alfried Krupp von Bohlen und Halbach Foundation and Cevian Capital. ThyssenKrupp's products range from machines and industrial services to high-speed trains, elevators, and shipbuilding. Subsidiary ThyssenKrupp Marine Systems also manufactures frigates, corvettes, and submarines for the German and foreign navies.

In 2018, ThyssenKrupp announced that the company would split into two companies, ThyssenKrupp Industrials and ThyssenKrupp Materials, but this plan was cancelled in May 2019.

History
ThyssenKrupp is the result of a merger of two German steel companies, Thyssen AG founded in 1891 under the name Gewerkschaft Deutscher Kaiser and Krupp founded in 1811. As early as the 1980s, the companies began negotiations on a merger and began closely cooperating in some business areas.  In 1997, the companies combined their flat steel activities, with a full merger completed in March 1999.

Beginnings (1811–1891)
Krupp
 1811: Friedrich Carl Krupp establishes a cast steel factory in Essen, Germany.
 1826: After Friedrich Krupp's death in 1826, his widow Therese Krupp runs the company together with other relatives and her eldest son Alfred, who was 14 years old at the time.
 1833: Krupp manufactures complete rolling machines.
 1847: Expansion of the railroads increases the demand for durable cast steel, triggering the company's first surge of growth. Supplies include axles, springs, and seamless tires that can withstand increasing speed without cracking.
 1859: The Prussian military orders 300 gun barrels, marking the development of the company's second major production segment; shortly after Krupp begins producing complete artillery.
 1862: Construction of the first Bessemer steel plant on the continent for mass production of rails and steel sheets.
 1864–1872: The company purchases various iron ore mines to avoid dependency on external suppliers. In 1873, Krupp establishes his own shipping company in Rotterdam to transport ore from the Spanish company Orconera Iron Ore Co., in which he owns shares.
 1872: Alfred Krupp issues a "General Directive" establishing company hierarchy from foreman to management. Included in the directive are regulations concerning company welfare programs, including the pension fund, sickness, and death benefit insurance, company bakery and retail store, worker housing estates, and health care, all of which were slowly introduced beginning in 1836.

Thyssen

 1867: Establishment of Thyssen, Fossoul & Co. a company making hoop iron for barrels, crates, baling etc.
 1871: Establishment of Thyssen & Co. in Mülheim an der Ruhr, Germany
 1891: August Thyssen becomes the owner of the Gewerkschaft Deutscher Kaiser coal mine in Hamborn near Duisburg. One year earlier, the Thyssen company constructed a steel mill directly adjacent to one of the pits, thus Thyssen grows into an iron and steel mill with its own coal base.

Wilhelminian period (1892–1917)
Krupp
 1893: Following the death of Alfred Krupp in 1887, Friedrich Alfred Krupp expands his father's enterprise with takeovers of additional steel mills and shipyards and construction of diesel engines in collaboration with Rudolf Diesel.
 1899: With the acquisition of and/or increased investment in various coal mines (Hannibal colliery near Bochum and the Emscher-Lippe coal mine near Datteln) business development concentrates on vertical structures with the expansion of a coal base.
 1903: Friedrich Alfred Krupp dies suddenly in 1902 at the age of 48 and his eldest daughter Bertha Krupp inherits the company. The company is converted into a stock corporation by the will of the late owner; Bertha retains all the stock. As she is still a minor, her mother Margarethe Krupp as guardian and proprietor takes over as the head of the company, managed by a board of directors.
 1906: Bertha Krupp marries Gustav von Bohlen und Halbach who adds the Krupp name as a prefix to his own family name. He is appointed vice-chairman of the board and serves as chairman through 1943.
 1912: Development of stainless, acid-resistant steels quickly finds application in the chemical and food processing industries, medicine, and building. The spire of New York's Chrysler Building is clad in the new stainless steel panels.

Thyssen
 1895: Thyssen sets up integrated iron and steel mill with the construction of a blast furnace plant at the Gewerkschaft Deutscher Kaiser. Subsequent expansion is focused on vertical integration of the group.
 1906: Intra-company trading and shipping organizations are established to facilitate the transport of iron ore to the blast furnace plants. In 1910, the N.V. Handels- en Transport Maatschappij Vulcaan ocean shipping company is established in Rotterdam to keep the Thyssen group independent of the international freight market.
 1910: Expansion with mills in the Lorraine and Normandy.
 1912: Various branches are set up in the Mediterranean area (Algiers, Port Said, Suez, Oran, Naples, Bona, Bizerte, Tangier, and Genoa) so that freighters can store coal en route to Russian or Indian ore mines besides delivery of coal or freight for third parties.
 1913: Attention is paid to Latin America with the founding of the Deutsch-Überseeische Handelsgesellschaft (German Overseas Trading Company). Thyssen constructs extensive housing estates and related infrastructure to attract workers to the western Ruhr area. By the end of 1913, Thyssen owns 8,750 housing units for 15,500 employees and 850 civil servants: housing for 44,000 people.
 1914: Gewerkschaft Deutscher Kaiser begins producing armaments for the First World War. To compensate for labor shortages, women, civilians from Belgium, and prisoners of war work for the company.

Weimar Republic (1918–1933)
Krupp
 1919: Following the Treaty of Versailles, Krupp reverts to peace-time production focusing on the manufacture of locomotives, trucks, agricultural machinery, and excavators. The post-war circumstances of inflation, occupation, and dismantling of the company's industrial infrastructure led to a financial crisis in 1924/25. The company stabilizes by, among other measures, streamlining processing operations and expanding stainless steel production.
 1926: Sintered tungsten carbide was developed by Osram as a material for machining metal. In 1925, Krupp buys the licence and launches sintered carbide onto the market, exploiting its exceptional hardness and wear resistance, which represents a breakthrough in tool engineering.
 1929: A 15,000-ton forging press goes into operation in Essen-Borbeck. It is at the time the largest worldwide.

Thyssen
 1919: The company is renamed from Gewerkschaft Deutscher Kaiser to August Thyssen-Hütte; Gewerkschaft and mining operations are transferred to an independent company, Gewerkschaft Friedrich Thyssen. The company's foreign interests in the Allied and Soviet countries are expropriated.
 1926: Major parts of the Thyssen group are transferred to a newly merged group, Vereinigte Stahlwerke AG, bringing together several coal and steel companies in the Ruhr area to solve cost and production problems of excess capacities. August Thyssen dies at Schloss Landsberg near Essen. His sons Fritz Thyssen and Heinrich Thyssen-Bornemisza inherit the industrial enterprises. His other two children, Hedwig and August Jr., are compensated differently.

Nazi Germany (1933–1945)
Krupp
 1937: As dictated by Hitler's Four-Year Plan, production of locomotives, trucks, and ships was expanded and armaments production resumed.
 1941: Krupp Germania shipyard was extended with the acquisition of Deutsche Schiff- und Maschinenbau AG "Deschimag" to include larger ships and submarines. Krupp took advantage of foreign labourers, slave labourers, prisoners of war, and Jews to compensate for labour shortages. It is estimated that a total of 100,000 people were forced to work by the company. Moreover, it had a workshop near the Auschwitz complex. Due to the company's involvement in the war, Alfried Krupp von Bohlen und Halbach was subsequently convicted for crimes against humanity and received a sentence of 12 years imprisonment during The United States of America vs. Alfried Krupp, et al., trial of December 8, 1947- July 31, 1948.

Thyssen
 1934: The company August Thyssen-Hütte AG is spun off the Vereinigte Stahlwerke AG as a so-called operating company.
 1939: Fritz Thyssen, chairman of the Board of Vereingte Stahlwerke AG, flees to Switzerland after the invasion of Poland. Vichy France hands over Thyssen and his wife to the German Reich at the end of 1940.
 1940: A rearmament policy is introduced by the Nazis in the mid-1930s and with the outbreak of war, labor is conscripted and supplemented by foreign workers, slave laborers, and prisoners of war.
 1945: Thyssenhütte mill in Hamborn occupied by US troops.

Mergers and acquisitions

During a period of expansion in 1978, Thyssen AG entered the North American automotive industry with the acquisition of Budd's automotive operations, which became the automotive division of Thyssen and operated in North America as Budd Thyssen, later ThyssenKrupp Budd Incorporated. In October 2006, ThyssenKrupp sold ThyssenKrupp Budd's North American body and chassis operations to Martinrea International Inc.

In 1988, ThyssenKrupp acquired German shock absorber manufacturer Bilstein, where it became a division until 2005, where it became a wholly owned subsidiary.

In 1991, ThyssenKrupp acquired German company Hoesch AG.

In 1999, Thyssen (one of the companies of the merger to form Thyssenkrupp Elevator) acquired the elevator division of American-based conglomerate Dover Corporation. Four years later, ThyssenKrupp acquired the Korean-based Dongyang Elevator.

In 2005, ThyssenKrupp acquired Howaldtswerke-Deutsche Werft (HDW) in Kiel from One Equity Partners.  One Equity Partners holds 25% of the TKMS shares.

In December 2005, ThyssenKrupp acquired 60% of Atlas Elektronik from BAE Systems, with EADS acquiring the remaining 40%.

In August 2007, ThyssenKrupp Materials North America acquired OnlineMetals.com, a small-quantity distributor of semi-finished metals and plastics based in Seattle, Washington.

In early 2008, ThyssenKrupp Aerospace acquired Apollo Metals and Aviation Metals, both suppliers to aerospace and defence based in Kent, Washington.

In June 2012, ThyssenKrupp sold Thyssenkrupp Waupaca to KPS Capital Partners. ThyssenKrupp Waupaca is a tier two supplier to the automotive industry, located in Waupaca, Wisconsin.

In April 2014, ThyssenKrupp announced it was in talks to sell its Swedish maritime defence unit to Saab after failing to agree deals with the Swedish government for a new generation of submarines.

ThyssenKrupp Access, the global manufacturer of home elevators, wheelchair lifts, and stairlifts, has tied up with Chennai-based Indian Company Elite Elevators. The company has launched luxury home elevators segments targeting HNI Clientele to launch high-end elevators in India.

In June 2018, Thyssenkrupp signed a final agreement with India's Tata Steel to establish a long-expected steel venture. The 50-50 joint venture will be called Thyssenkrupp Tata Steel and will be the second-largest steel producer in Europe, after ArcelorMittal.

Divestments and Restructures of Steel Business

Steel Europe
In September 2017, ThyssenKrupp and India-based Tata Steel announced plans to combine their European steel-making businesses. The final agreement was signed in June 2018. The deal would have structured the European assets as ThyssenKrupp Tata Steel, a 50-50 joint venture headquartered in Amsterdam and created the second-largest steel producer in Europe. The merger was finally prohibited by the EU Commission in 2019 for competitive concerns.

Steel Americas
In 2013, ThyssenKrupp sold its US steel business to ArcelorMittal and Nippon Steel for $1.55 billion. In February 2017, it agreed to sell its Brazilian steel business CSA to Ternium for €1.5 billion. These two transactions meant that Thyssenkrupp fully parted from the Steel Americas business.

On 11 May 2007, ThyssenKrupp AG invested €3.1 billion for a project consisting of building new carbon steel and stainless steel processing facilities in southern Alabama that would employ 2,700 people. The project, along with a multibillion-dollar greenfield steel-making facility in Brazil, is a cornerstone of ThyssenKrupp's new global expansion strategy into the North American and NAFTA high-value carbon steel markets. The company announced that the investment was increased to $4.6 billion in 2010. As of the date of the announcement, the investment was the largest private economic development investment in Alabama's history and the largest by a German company in the U.S.  The site selection announcement came after several months of competition involving several southeastern sites which were eventually narrowed between a site on the Mississippi River in Convent, Louisiana, and a site on the Tombigbee River, in Calvert, Alabama in North Mobile County, about 40 miles north of Mobile.  The site in Alabama was eventually chosen. Groundbreaking on the Calvert facilities was held in November 2007. The carbon steel and stainless steel companies are independent and operate under different management teams. Co-locating both facilities on the same site enabled the company to optimize the investment in infrastructure and in some shared processing.

The carbon steel company, ThyssenKrupp Steel USA, which represented seventy percent of the overall project investment and hiring, consists of a hot strip mill, cold rolling mill, and four hot-dip galvanizing lines. The hot strip mill began operations in July 2010, the cold roll mill in September 2010, and the first of the hot-dip galvanizing lines in March 2011. The company projects to be fully operational in late 2011 and employ approximately 1,800 people at that time. ThyssenKrupp Stainless USA projects to employ approximately 900 people when fully operational in late 2012. At full production, ThyssenKrupp Steel USA will have the capacity to produce 4 million metric tons of carbon steel for NAFTA customers in the automotive, construction, appliance, pipe and tube, and service center industries. In July 2011, the carbon steel project was awarded "Best Greenfield Technology" by American Metal Market, considered to be the longest continuously published newspaper in the metals industry. ThyssenKrupp Stainless USA built a cold roll mill and is in the process of building a melt shop.

Additionally, the Alabama State Port Authority invested over $100 million to build a state-of-the-art transloading slab terminal on the southern tip of Pinto Island in Mobile Bay to service the inbound raw material slabs for the upriver carbon steel facility. Raw material slabs shipped to the Alabama facility from ThyssenKrupp CSA are transloaded from Panamax ships at the terminal onto shallow draft barges for transport upriver to the facility.  The terminal is equipped with three wide-span gantry cranes with state-of-the-art magnetic lifting gear designed by ThyssenKrupp, and it utilizes RFID technology to read identifiers on each slab and provide up-to-date inventory records that include each slab's location and weight.  The same magnetic technology is also used at ThyssenKrupp's Calvert facility. The terminal was necessary to Alabama's award of the project since the Tombigbee River depth and lack of turning basins prohibit deep draft ship navigation to the site in Calvert.

The world steel industry peaked in 2007, just as the company spent $12 billion to build the two most modern mills in the world, in Alabama and Brazil. The worldwide Great Recession started in 2008. Heavy cutbacks in construction combined with sharply lowered demand, and prices fell 40%. ThyssenKrupp lost $11 billion on its two new plants, which sold steel below the cost of production. ThyssenKrupp's stainless steel division, Inoxum, including the stainless portion of the US plant, was sold to Finnish stainless steel company Outokumpu in 2012. Finally in 2013, ThyssenKrupp offered the remaining portion of the plant for sale at under $4 billion. They sold it the following year for $1.55 billion.

In April 2015, ThyssenKrupp announced it would be investing more than €800 million in the North American region by 2020 to take advantage of the economy's reindustrialization.

ThyssenKrupp Tailored Blanks
In September 2012, ThyssenKrupp agreed to sell the automotive components manufacturer Tailored Blanks to the China-based Wuhan Iron and Steel Corporation for an undisclosed price. At the time of the agreement Tailored Blanks had annual sales of around 700 million euros and a global market share of about 40 percent in automotive laser-welded blanks.

ThyssenKrupp Elevator
In February 2020, ThyssenKrupp AG's board announced that it would sell its elevator segment to Advent International, Cinven, and RAG foundation for $18.9 billion. The transaction closed in July 2020; stand-alone company is named TK Elevator.

Financial data

Carbon footprint
ThyssenKrupp reported Total e emissions (Direct + Indirect) for the twelve months ending 30 September 2020 at 22,700 Kt (-1,400 /-5.8% y-o-y).

Employees

As of 2020, the company had over 100,000 employees worldwide. Following a financial struggle in 2020, and a loss of over €5.5 billion, ThyssenKrupp announced that it will be cutting over 11,000 jobs, 7,000 of which are located in Germany.

Products and sales
ThyssenKrupp generates 33% of its consolidated sales in its home market. The rest of the European Union (EU) (28%) and the NAFTA region (21%) are the key trading partners for business and exports outside Germany.

Business areas
The operations are organized in five business areas:
 Components technology
 Elevator technology
 Industrial machinery
 Materials services
 Steel

Construction of the corporate headquarters began in 2007. The first buildings were complete in 2010; the second phase of the building was completed in June 2015. Situated in the west of Essen, the corporate campus was designed by Chaix & Morel et associeés (Paris) and JSWD Architekten (Cologne). Their design was selected for construction in an architectural design competition in 2006.

Controversies

Price fixing
In November 2006, five elevator manufacturers, including ThyssenKrupp, were found guilty of price fixing by the EU, over nine years, along with competitors Otis Elevator Co., Schindler Group, Kone and Mitsubishi Elevator Europe.  A few months later on 21 February 2007, ThyssenKrupp was fined €479 million by the EU (Otis was fined $US295 million). The EU Competition Commission reported that the companies had worked to rig bids for procurement contracts, share markets, and fix prices between at least 1995 and 2004. The Commission reported that the companies "did not contest the facts" found by EU regulators, noting none of the accused requested a hearing to answer the allegations. The fines totaled US$1.3 billion.

In July 2012, the German Bundeskartellamt served fines totalling €124.5 million on ThyssenKrupp GfT Gleistechnik GmbH, Essen (€103m), Stahlberg Roensch GmbH, Seevetal, which since 2010 belongs to the Vossloh group (€13m), TSTG Schienen Technik GmbH & Co. KG, Duisburg, a subsidiary of the Voestalpine group (€4.5m) and Voestalpine BWG GmbH & Co. KG, Butzbach, another Voestalpine subsidiary (€4m) for price-fixing of steel railway lines and points blades supplied to Deutsche Bahn, the German state railway. According to Andreas Mundt, president of the Bundeskartellamt, "For many years the rail suppliers have guaranteed each other virtually constant shares of Deutsche Bahn's contract volume. The cartel members monitored compliance with the contract volume quotas, assigned each other projects, and set protective prices in order to steer the contract award process.” The proceedings had been triggered by an application for leniency filed by the Austrian company Voestalpine AG. Investigations into further companies are ongoing.

Turin plant fire and trial
On the early morning of  6 December 2007, an accident on the annealing and pickling line of the ThyssenKrupp plant in Turin, Italy, caused the death of seven steelworkers.

The accident happened between 00:45 and 00:48, when the eight workers that were then on duty attempted to extinguish a localized small pool fire with  fire extinguishers and a fire hydrant, without success. Roughly 400L of hydraulic oil escaped during the rupture of a hydraulic circuit that caused a violent jet fire and engulfed the workers that were fighting the fire.

CEO Espenhahn has been charged by the State prosecutor of Turin with "voluntary multiple murder with possible malice" ("omicidio volontario multiplo con dolo eventuale"), while five other managers and executives have been charged with "culpable murder with conscious guilt". On Friday 15 April 2011, Espenhahn and all the other indictees were pronounced guilty of all charges; Espenhahn has been sentenced to 16 years and 6 months in jail and to a lifelong ban from holding public office. Prior to the court case, Espenhahn was transferred from Italy and is now believed to reside in Brazil. On 23 February 2013, the Appellate Court changed the sentence for Espenhahn to culpable murder, not recognizing the voluntary murder, thus reducing the conviction. Convictions for the other managers were reduced as well.

In May 2016, the appeal court reduced the sentences for Espenhahn down to 9 years and 8 months, the other 5 managers (4 Italians and 1 German) between 6 and 7 years. Priegnitz the German manager, was sentenced to 6 years and 3 months. According to the bilateral laws between Germany and Italy, the convicted can serve the term in his home country and with accordance to this countries' laws. Since accounts of first-degree murder have been appealed down to aggravated negligent manslaughter, the German convicts are expecting further reductions that would eventually not exceed 5 years.

Bribery and conflict of interest
ThyssenKrupp is suspected of corruption in deals made in Israel, Turkey, South Africa and also in Pakistan, where the deal did not mature. In Greece, the defense minister was sentenced to prison for accepting a bribe from a consortium in which one of the members was ThyssenKrupp.

Incidents
ThyssenKrupp has been the victim of major, organised hacking attacks on several occasions, targeting the company's trade secrets.

On 8 December 2016, it was disclosed the company was attacked in February of that year. Internally uncovered in April 2016, it took their IT team around six months to fix. The hack is thought to have originated from South-East Asia and was successful in retrieving information from various departments, including the plant engineering division.

In 2012, ThyssenKrupp and other European companies have been attacked by Chinese hackers.

See also

 List of steel producers
List of conglomerates
 List of elevator manufacturers
Transrapid
Shanghai Maglev Train
South African Arms Deal
Dolphin-class submarine
Eclipse (yacht)

References
 James, Harold. Krupp: A History of the Legendary German Firm. Princeton, NJ: Princeton University Press, 2012. .

Notes

External links

Thyssenkrupp System Engineering
Bilstein (international)

 
Conglomerate companies of Germany
Multinational companies headquartered in Germany
Steel companies of Germany
Steel companies of Italy
Conglomerate companies established in 1999
Manufacturing companies established in 1999
Vehicle manufacturing companies established in 1999
1999 establishments in Germany
German brands
Price fixing convictions
Companies in the MDAX